Yu Hexin ( born 1 January 1996) is a Chinese swimmer. He competed in the men's 4 × 100 metre freestyle relay event at the 2016 Summer Olympics. He won the men's 50m freestyle event at the 2018 Asian Games.

Personal bests

Long course (50-meter pool)

Short course (25-meter pool)

Key: NR = National Record ; AS = Asian Record

References

External links
 

 
 
 
 

1996 births
Living people
Chinese male butterfly swimmers
Olympic swimmers of China
Swimmers at the 2016 Summer Olympics
Place of birth missing (living people)
Swimmers at the 2014 Summer Youth Olympics
Asian Games medalists in swimming
Asian Games gold medalists for China
Asian Games silver medalists for China
Asian Games bronze medalists for China
Medalists at the 2014 Asian Games
Medalists at the 2018 Asian Games
Swimmers at the 2014 Asian Games
Swimmers at the 2018 Asian Games
Youth Olympic gold medalists for China
Chinese male freestyle swimmers
Swimmers at the 2020 Summer Olympics
21st-century Chinese people